The HR4000 is a rapid transit railcar being manufactured by CRRC and assembled in Springfield, MA for the Los Angeles Metro Rail heavy rail lines. A total of 64 cars are being built as part of the base order, primarily for initial section of the D Line Extension, with 5 (contradictory information exists about this) options that total 218 cars, 282 cars total, intended to replace the Breda A650 as well as for overall expansion and to accommodate the later parts of the extension.

Development 
Shortly after the groundbreaking of the Purple Line Extension in 2014, procurement started for new trains to run on it. The base order consists of 64 cars, 34 for the Purple Line Extension Phase 1, and 30 to replace the first order A650s (cars 501-530) with DC motors, which would have been retired in 2021, although this has not occurred. In 2014 there were 4 option orders totaling to 218 cars; 112 cars for general expansion, 20 cars for Purple Line Extension Phase 2, 12 for Phase 3, and the remaining 74 to replace the second order of A650s (cars 531-604) with AC motors (to have been retired 2030). The base order was to be delivered from 2019 to 2021, with the options from 2021 to 2030. CRRC was chosen as the manufacturer in 2017. At that point, they had expected a Spring 2020 first delivery with completion in 2021. To accommodate this order, yard expansion work started in 2019. As of January 2022, it is scheduled for completion in 2023.

The design was first unveiled in July 2021.

Design 
The exterior design shows influence from the Kinki Sharyo P3010s found on the light rail lines with yellow sides and full-color LED destination signs, compared to the green monochrome dot-matrix LED signs used with the A650s. Internally, it features more longitudinal seating than its predecessors to increase capacity (although early renders depicted against such).

See also 
Los Angeles Metro Rail rolling stock
 Breda A650

References 

Los Angeles Metro Rail

Electric multiple units of the United States
750 V DC multiple units
CRRC multiple units